Brian Robert Kyme (22 June 1935 – 16 April 2020) was an Australian Anglican bishop, National Director of the Australian Board of Missions, and author.

Later he studied at Edith Cowan University. He served curacies in Malvern and Morwell. He was the Incumbent at St Matthew's Church, Ashburton from 1963 to 1969 and Dean of Geraldton from 1969 to 1974. He was then at Claremont, Western Australia from 1974 and Archdeacon of Stirling, WA from 1977. In 1982 he became Assistant Bishop of Perth, serving until 1999.

From 1993 to 2000 he served as National Director of the Australian Board of Missions. 

Kyme died on 16 April 2020 from cancer.

Bibliography 
Bishop Kyme wrote a number of books on history of Anglican church organisations and schools.

 Do this in remembrance of me!: a communion handbook for the reflective Christian, 1985 with Brian Haig
 Grit & grace: the story of the Anglican Board of Mission - Australia, 2013, with Jan Carroll
 John Septimus Roe: the man and the school named in his honour, 2010 
 Six archbishops and their ordinands: a study of the leadership provided by successive Archbishops of Perth in their recruitment and formation of clergy in Western Australia, 1914-2005 [thesis], 2005
 The Wollaston legacy, 2007, with Edward Doncaster and Jan Carroll

References

1935 births
2020 deaths
Edith Cowan University alumni
Alumni of Ridley College, Melbourne
20th-century Anglican bishops in Australia
Deans of Geraldton
Archdeacons of Stirling, WA
Assistant bishops in the Anglican Diocese of Perth